Mirror Lake is a mountain lake in Clackamas County of the U.S. state of Oregon.

It is among the most popular day hikes in the Mount Hood area, and a popular Nordic skiing destination.

References

Lakes of Clackamas County, Oregon
Lakes of Oregon
Mountain lakes
Protected areas of Clackamas County, Oregon
Mount Hood National Forest